The 2007–08 Ukrainian Cup is the 17th annual edition of Ukraine's football knockout competition, the Ukrainian Cup.

The Cup started with the round of 32, but it also had couple of preliminaries. In the Ukrainian Second League, neither FC Arsenal Bila Tserkva nor FC Nyva-Svitanok Vinnytsia submitted their licenses to take part in this year's competition.

Team allocation 
Fifty-four teams entered the competition

Distribution

Round and draw dates 
All draws held at FFU headquarters (Building of Football) in Kyiv unless stated otherwise.

Competition schedule

First preliminary round 
The matches of the First Preliminary Round took place on July 20, 2007.

Second preliminary round 
The matches of the Second Preliminary Round took place on August 8, 2007, except the match of FC Halychyna Lviv and PFC Olexandria which took place on August 5.

The teams FC Stal Alchevsk and FC Illychivets Mariupol made it straight to the First Elimination Round, because the Alchevsk and Mariupol clubs rank the highest among the other First League participants.

Bracket

Round of 32 
In this round entered all 16 teams from Premier League. They were drawn against the 16 winners from the previous round, who played home in this round. The matches were played on September 24–26, 2007.

Round of 16 
The Second Elimination Round of the Ukrainian Cup consisted of 16 competitors and took place on October 31, 2007.

Quarterfinals 

|}

First leg 
The Quarterfinals consist of two matches per pair of club. The games took place from November 17 to January 15, 2007.

Second leg 

Metalurh Donetsk won 4–2 on aggregate.

Dynamo Kyiv won 3–2 on aggregate.

Shakhtar Donetsk won 4–1 on aggregate.

Chornomorets Odessa won 5–2 on aggregate.

Semifinals (1/2) 
The Semifinals took place on March 19 and April 16, 2008.

|}

First leg

Second leg 

Shakhtar Donetsk won 5–1 on aggregate.

Dynamo Kyiv won 3–1 on aggregate.

Final

Top goalscorers 
The top scorers in the 2007–08 Ukrainian Cup are as follows:

See also 
 2007–08 Ukrainian Premier League

References

External links 
 Calendar of Matches—Schedule of the Ukrainian Cup on Professional Football League of Ukraine Website. 

Ukrainian Cup seasons
Cup
Ukrainian Cup